The 2008–09 Israel State Cup (Gvia HaMedina) was the 70th season of Israel's nationwide football cup competition and the 55th after the Israeli Declaration of Independence.

The competition was won by Beitar Jerusalem who had beaten Maccabi Haifa 2–1 in the final.

As Beitar Jerusalem wasn't eligible for participating in UEFA competitions, and as runners-up Maccabi Haifa already qualified to 2009–10 UEFA Champions League, all Europa League spots were awarded to teams according to their league positions.

Calendar

Results

First round
Games were played from September 5 to 8, 2008.

Second round
Games were played from September 12 to 15, 2008.

Third round
Games were played on October 3 and 4, 2008.

Fourth round
Games were played on October 20, 2008.

Fifth round
Games were played on October 7, 8 and November 3, 2008.

Sixth Round
Games were played on November 14 and 15, 2008.

Seventh Round
Games were played from December 23 to 27, 2008.

Eighth Round
Games were played on January 13, 20 and 27, 2009.

Ninth Round
Games were played from February 13 to 16, 2009.

Round of 16 to the Final
Games were played from March 10 to May 26, 2009.

External links
 Israel Football Association website

Israel State Cup
State Cup 2008-09
Israel State Cup seasons